FK Jugohrom is a football club based in the village of Jegunovce near Tetovo, North Macedonia. They recently played in the OFS Tetovo league.

History
The club was founded in 1952.

The club was in the once time recorded excellent results in the Macedonian Second League.

Honours
 Macedonian Second League:
Runners-up (1): 1997–98
Third place (1): 2000–01

References

External links
Club info at MacedonianFootball 
Football Federation of Macedonia 

Football clubs in North Macedonia
Association football clubs established in 1952
1952 establishments in the Socialist Republic of Macedonia
Jegunovce Municipality